Auguste Richard (14 February 1883-31 August 1914) was a French rower. He competed in the men's coxed four, inriggers event at the 1912 Summer Olympics.

References

1883 births
Year of death missing
French male rowers
Olympic rowers of France
Rowers at the 1912 Summer Olympics
Rowers from Paris